The Crown Royal 200 at the Glen was a Rolex Sports Car Series race held at Watkins Glen International.  The race was first run in 1984 by the IMSA GT Championship.  The "New York 500" initially was a second Watkins Glen round running for a shorter  distance compared to the Continental, using both classes of competitors.  However, in 1986, the race was split into two events, the prototypes retaining the 500 km event, and GT cars given a shorter  race.  In 1987 prototypes were dropped entirely, and the race served as a 500 km GT event until 1991.  Grand-Am revived the race in 2001, running the event on the same weekend as the NASCAR Sprint Cup Series series' Heluva Good! Sour Cream Dips at The Glen, and using Watkins Glen's short course.

On April 7, 2021, IMSA announced the cancellation of the event at Canadian Tire Motorsport Park because of Canadian quarantine restrictions, replacing it with a standard-distance (three hour race, 2 hours, 40 minutes of racing format) at Watkins Glen International on Friday, July 2, dubbed the "WeatherTech 240 at The Glen." The race used the format intended for Mosport, with all classes competing;  however the GTD class only scored points towards the WeatherTech Sprint Cup.

 Combined Prototype/GT field
 Separate Prototype & GT races
 Daytona Prototypes only

References

External links
 Watkins Glen International
 Rolex Sports Car Series
 Ultimate Racing History: Watkins Glen archive

Grand-Am races
IMSA GT Championship races
Motorsport competitions in New York (state)
Recurring sporting events established in 1984